Alafia is a genus of lianas or climbing shrubs found in tropical Africa and Madagascar. The World Checklist of Selected Plant Families recognises 26 species:

References

 
Flora of Africa